The 1906 VMI Keydets football team represented the Virginia Military Institute (VMI) in their 16th season of organized football. The Keydets went an even 4–4 under second-year head coach Ira Johnson.

Schedule

References

VMI
VMI Keydets football seasons
VMI Keydets football